{
	"type": "FeatureCollection",
	"features": [		{
			"type": "Feature",
			"properties": { "marker-symbol": "dam", "marker-size": "small", "title": "Machhu dam" },
			"geometry": { "type": "Point", "coordinates": [70.865833, 22.763889] }
		},

{
			"type": "Feature",
			"properties": { "marker-symbol": "town", "marker-size": "small", "title": "Morbi" },
			"geometry": { "type": "Point", "coordinates": [70.83, 22.82] }
},

]

}

The Machchhu dam failure or Morbi disaster is a dam-related flood disaster which occurred on 11 August 1979. The Machchu-2 dam, situated on the Machchhu river, failed, sending a wall of water through the town of Morbi (now in the Morbi district) of Gujarat, India. Estimates of the number of people killed vary greatly ranging from 1,800 to 25,000 people.

The Machchu II dam 

It was an earthfill dam. The dam was meant to serve an irrigation scheme. Considering the long history of drought in Saurashtra region, the primary consideration at the time of design was water supply, not flood control. It consisted of a masonry spillway of  consisting 18 sluice gates across the river section and long earthen embankments on both sides. The embankments had a 6.1 m top width, with upstream and downstream slopes 1:3 (V:H) and 1:2 respectively; and a clay core extending through alluvium to bedrock. The upstream face consisted of 61 cm small gravel and a 61 cm hand packed rip-rap.

Failure
The failure was caused by excessive rain and massive flooding leading to the disintegration of the earthen walls of the four kilometre long Machchhu-2 dam. Within 20 minutes the floods of  height inundated the low-lying areas of Morbi industrial town located 5 km below the dam.

Around 3.30 pm the tremendous swirling flow of water struck Morbi. Water level rose to  within the next 15 minutes and some low lying areas of city were under  of water for the next 6 hours. 

The Morbi dam failure was listed as the worst dam burst in the Guinness Book of Records (before the death toll of the 1975 Banqiao Dam failure was declassified in 2005). The book No One Had A Tongue To Speak by Tom Wooten and Utpal Sandesara debunks the official claims that the dam failure was an act of God and points to structural and communication failures that led to and exacerbated the disaster. There was great economic loss. The flood damaged farmland, leading to a decrease in productivity of crops.

The book by Wooten and Sandesara gives vivid first person accounts of many survivors. It narrates how people scrambled for rooftops, hilltops, and other safe grounds in order to save themselves. Over a hundred people took shelter in Vajepar Ram Mandir but later the deluge submerged them with the temple. Women were compelled to drop their babies into the furious surge in order to save themselves and people lost their loved ones in a flash.

During reconstruction of the dam the capacity of the spillway was increased by four times and fixed at about 21,000 m3/s.

Popular culture
The Gujarati disaster film Machchhu is based on the Machchhu dam failure.

See also 

 2022 Morbi bridge collapse

References

Dam failures in Asia
1979 disasters in India
Dams in Gujarat
History of Gujarat (1947–present)
Morbi district
Floods in Gujarat
Man-made disasters in India